Chinese Vietnamese or Vietnamese Chinese may refer to:

Language
Sino-Vietnamese vocabulary, Chinese-derived vocabulary in the Vietnamese language
Literary Chinese in Vietnam, a script for the Vietnamese language
Chữ Nôm, an adaptation of Chinese characters used to write the Vietnamese language directly

People
Ethnic Chinese in Vietnam:
Hoa, Chinese who immigrated to Vietnam during the Qing Dynasty and Republic of China period
Ngái, rural-dwelling Chinese speakers, counted separately from the Hoa

Vietnamese people in China:
Gin people, one of the 55 officially recognised ethnic minorities of the People's Republic of China
Vietnamese people in Hong Kong

Relations between China and Vietnam
Typically in the hyphenated forms Chinese-Vietnamese or Vietnamese-Chinese:
Any of the periods of Chinese rule in the history of Vietnam
First Chinese domination (History of Vietnam), 207 BC–39 AD
Second Chinese domination (History of Vietnam), 43–544
Third Chinese domination (History of Vietnam), 602–905
Fourth Chinese domination (History of Vietnam), 1407–1427
Sino-Vietnamese War of 1979
People's Republic of China–Vietnam relations